Oleksiy Butovsky (June 21, 1838 — March 10, 1917) was one of the founders of the International Olympic Committee, Lieutenant general of Imperial Russian Army, teacher at the Poltava Cadet Corps and sports functionary.

Biography 
Oleksiy Butovsky was born June 9, 1838 in Piatyhirtsi  in a cossack family. Father Dmytro Butovsky, mother Nadiya Reiser. In his youth he studied English, German and French, graduated from a special boarding school, served as a tutor of Military science at the Poltava Cadet Corps, he studied at the Nikolaevsky Engineering-Technical University.

This work, as well as service in the regular army what participated in combat, cooperation with the Main Directorate of Military Educational Institutions allowed Butovsky understand the importance of the physical education in preparing future officers. Along with performing regular duties education officer Oleksiy was initiated in high school classes in gymnastics, fencing, outdoor games, read them developed a course on theory and techniques of gymnastics and physical exercises. In the late 80-s of the 19th century Oleksiy Butovsky became one of the most popular experts in the field of physical education, his name was well known abroad. After one of the trips abroad, he noted with regret that in many countries the problem of physical education understood and supported in the power echelons, and in Russia, these issues have been neglected.

Oleksiy Butovsky and Pierre de Coubertin periodically met and regular corresponded in French, which Oleksiy knew very well. They met in 1892 in France, where on orders of military departments of Russia, Butovskiy studied the training of gymnasts and fencers. Convened de Coubertin Congress defined the timing and venue of the first two modern Olympics - Athens and Paris, 1896 and 1900 - and chose the first members of the IOC. Naturally, from Russia to it came General Butovsky.

In 1896 Oleksiy Butovsky attended as a member of the IOC at the Olympic Games in Athens. Butovsky outlined details of the first modern Olympics in the book "Athens in the spring of 1896" - the first and the only one Russian-language publication devoted to this historic event.

He died in Petrograd in 1917 in the rank of General of the Infantry during the events of the February Revolution.

References 

 Олексій Бутовський – провісник сучасного олімпійського руху  
 Бутовський Олексій Дмитрович в ЕСУ 
 Bubka, Sergey: A many-sided life: cadreman, educationalist, theorist and practitioner of physical education, researcher, personality that defines Olympic movement (Problems of Physical Training and Sports, 2012, vol.3 pp. 6–12)

1838 births
1917 deaths
People from Poltava Oblast
People from Kremenchugsky Uyezd
Imperial Russian Army generals
Founders of the modern Olympic Games
Russian people of the January Uprising